Pacific Northwest National Laboratory (PNNL) is one of the United States Department of Energy national laboratories, managed by the Department of Energy's (DOE) Office of Science. The main campus of the laboratory is in Richland, Washington.

Originally named the Pacific Northwest Laboratory, PNL was established in 1965 when research and development at the Hanford Site was separated from other Hanford operations. In 1995, the laboratory was renamed the Pacific Northwest National Laboratory also known as PNNL.

Facilities

PNNL houses several scientific user facilities and research facilities.

Scientific user facilities
The Environmental Molecular Sciences Laboratory (EMSL) is a U.S. Department of Energy national scientific user facility.

The Bioproducts, Sciences, and Engineering Laboratory (BSEL) is a joint effort between Washington State University and PNNL, and is located on the WSU-Tri-Cities campus.  Within BSEL, researchers are developing technology for converting agricultural byproducts into chemicals for products like plastics, solvents, fibers, pharmaceuticals, and fuel additives.

Researchers at PNNL's Radiochemical Processing Laboratory are developing processes to advance the cleanup of radiological and hazardous wastes; the processing and disposal of nuclear fuels; and the production and delivery of medical isotopes.

The Applied Process Engineering Laboratory (APEL) is a technology business startup user facility, sponsored in part by PNNL.  APEL provides engineering- and manufacturing-scale space and chemical, biological, and electronic laboratories and equipment for developing, validating, and commercializing new products.

Research facilities

Three research facilities were constructed on PNNL's Richland, Washington campus to partially replace laboratory and office space PNNL had been using on the south end of the nearby Hanford Site.

The Physical Sciences Facility, a federally funded research complex that was designed by Flad Architects, opened in 2010 houses PNNL's research into materials science, radiation detection, and ultra-trace analysis.
The privately funded Computational Sciences Facility and Biological Sciences Facility house about 310 staff who support PNNL's energy, environmental, national security, and fundamental science research missions. These two new facilities opened in 2009. The CSF contains scientific capabilities in information analytics, high-performance computing, cyber security and bioinformatics. The BSF focuses on bioenergy, environmental and soil remediation and includes systems biology, microbial and cellular biology and analytical interfacial chemistry.

The Electricity Infrastructure Operations Center at PNNL combines software, real-time power grid data and computation into a control room setting. The ideas and technologies developed in the EIOC address better management of the power grid. The EIOC also is available to utilities, vendors, government agencies and universities interested in research, development or training.

PNNL-Sequim (2022-present), previously known as the Marine and Coastal Research Laboratory (2021) and the Marine Sciences Laboratory (1966-2021), located at Sequim, Washington, is the DOE's only marine laboratory. PNNL-Sequim provides analytical and general-purpose laboratories, as well as wet or support laboratories supplied with heated and cooled freshwater and seawater. More than 20 engineers and scientists work on coastal restoration and security projects, from reviving salmon habitat to research on how shellfish could detect a bioterrorist attack. PNNL-Sequim also operates a  research vessel.

Other PNNL research facilities include the following:
 Research Aircraft 
 Pretreatment Engineering Platform
 Microproducts Breakthrough Institute
 Instrument Performance Testing
 Hanford Meteorological Station 
 In Vivo Radioassay and Research Facility
 Non-Destructive Analysis Laboratory
 Radiological Calibration and Irradiation Facility
 Proteomics other Mass Spectrometry-based Omics
 Shallow underground laboratory for low-activity radiation measurement

Notable scientists
PNNL staff have received numerous awards and recognition. These achievements include six E.O. Lawrence Awards, one Coblentz Award, four Discover Magazine Awards, two Christopher Columbus Fellowship Foundation Homeland Security Awards, and PECASE (Presidential Early Career award for Scientists and Engineers) Awards. PNNL staff serve as editors-in-chief for scientific journals, hold office in national and international technical societies, and have been granted Guggenheim fellowships, Humboldt Research Awards, and society medals. Staff have been elected to the rank of fellow in national societies including, but not limited to, the American Association for the Advancement of Science, American Physical Society, and the Materials Research Society.

Previous PNNL researchers include Benoit Mandelbrot.

Facts and figures
 5,400+ staff members (scientists, engineers and business professionals) 
 Business volume of $955 million for FY15 (research and development expenditures)
 107 R&D 100 Awards for significant innovations since 1969
 81 Federal Laboratory Consortium awards for technology transfer since 1984
 2,410 U.S. and foreign patents since 1965
 According to Essential Science Indicators  rankings, PNNL ranks among top 1% in publications and citations (FY13) in:
 Biology and biochemistry
 Chemistry
 Clinical medicine
 Engineering
 Environment and ecology
 Geosciences 
 Materials science
 Microbiology
 Pharmacology and toxicology
 Physics
 The main campus is located in Richland, Washington; PNNL operates a marine research facility in Sequim, and has satellite offices in Seattle and Tacoma, Washington; Portland, Oregon; College Park, Maryland, and Washington, D.C.  The Laboratory has been operated by Ohio-based Battelle since 1965.

History

PNNL was established in 1965 but traces its origins to World War II, in the establishment of the Hanford Site in 1943. Plutonium production for the Manhattan Project required extensive research and development activities at the Hanford Site. The General Electric Company began operating the site in 1946 and consolidated R&D into the new Hanford Laboratory in 1953. After GE ended its contract in 1963 to avoid conflicts with its growing commercial nuclear business, the Atomic Energy Commission split the Hanford contract among several organizations, awarding the laboratory contract to Ohio-based Battelle Memorial Institute. Battelle took over operations on January 4, 1965, and named it the Pacific Northwest Laboratory.

Initially, PNL's research emphasized nuclear energy and non-destructive uses for nuclear materials, including the design for the Fast Flux Test Facility to test fuels and materials for the AEC's commercial nuclear power program. However, PNL scientists and engineers also worked on nongovernment projects. Jim Russell patented a method for optical digital recording and playback, eventually used in compact discs and digital video discs, while a Senior Scientist at PNL in the 1960s and 1970s.  In 1969, NASA chose PNL to measure the concentration of both solar and galactic cosmic-ray-produced radionuclides in lunar material collected from the entire Apollo program.

In the 1970s, PNL expanded into energy, environment, health and national security research. The shift occurred as the AEC was replaced by the Energy Research and Development Administration (ERDA) in 1974 and the Department of Energy in 1977. During this period, researchers at PNL developed vitrification, a process to lock hazardous waste inside glass, and an acoustic holography technique allowing medical personnel to view internal organs, detect fetal abnormalities, and locate blood clots without an operation.

In the 1980s, PNL researchers introduced the first portable blood irradiator for leukemia treatments, and worked with the Fred Hutchinson Cancer Research Center in Seattle under a cooperative research and development agreement to develop safe and effective protocols for its use. In the mid-1980s, PNL became one of the U.S. Department of Energy's multiprogram laboratories.
 
In 1995, the laboratory was renamed the Pacific Northwest National Laboratory.  The Laboratory's global environmental and nuclear nonproliferation work moved to the forefront during the 1990s. The Pacific Northwest Center for Global Security was established to coordinate nuclear nonproliferation programs, research and policy work within the Laboratory and throughout the region. The Material Identification System and the Ultrasonic Pulse Echo instrument, technologies developed at Pacific Northwest National Laboratory, were provided to customs inspectors in Eastern Europe and former Soviet Union republics to reduce smuggling and terrorism.  Researchers also studied global climate models, including cloud formation and radiative properties of clouds. In addition, the Laboratory created energy efficiency centers to promote economic growth while mitigating its harmful effects and participating on the United Nations panel on climate change assessments.

In 2007, more than 20 PNNL scientists were recognized for their contributions to the Intergovernmental Panel on Climate Change (IPCC) that received the 2007 Nobel Peace Prize in equal parts with former Vice President Al Gore.

Technologies to counter acts of terrorism have progressed at PNNL in this decade with the expansion of radiation portal monitoring technology developed at the Laboratory. This technology is used at ports of entry around the country to scan for and detect the presence of nuclear and radiological materials. In 2004, The U.S. Department of Homeland Security established the National Visualization and Analytics Center (NVAC) to advance visualization research using computer technology to enable humans to visually synthesize and derive insight from massive amounts of information to help the nation predict and respond to manmade and natural disasters and terrorist incidents.

PNNL scientists are designing catalysts to use solar energy to power reactions that turn water into hydrogen.  They are incorporating the concepts of energy matching and proton relays to design inexpensive nickel and cobalt containing molecular complexes that catalyze that reaction.  DOE has awarded $22.5 million over five years for PNNL's new Center for Molecular Electrocatalysis, where scientists will study catalysts that convert electrical energy into chemical bonds and back again.

PNNL directors
 Sherwood Fawcett (1965–1967)
 Fred Albaugh (1967–1971)
 Ron Paul (1971–1973)
 Ed Alpen (1973–1975)
 Tommy Ambrose (1975–1979)
 Doug Olesen (1979–1984)
 William R. Wiley (1984–1994)
 Bill Madia (1994–2000)
 Lura Powell (2000–2003)
 Leonard Peters (2003–2007)
 Mike Kluse (2008–2015)
 Steve Ashby (2015–Present)

References

External links 

 

United States Department of Energy national laboratories
Federally Funded Research and Development Centers
Tri-Cities, Washington
Battelle Memorial Institute
Buildings and structures in Benton County, Washington
Richland, Washington
Research institutes in Washington (state)
Radiation protection organizations